The Hammam of Sultan Inal is a historic hammam (public bathhouse) in Cairo, Egypt. It is located in the Bayn al-Qasrayn area, on al-Mu'izz street, in the historic center of Cairo. The hammam was commissioned by Sultan Inal and built in 1456, during the Mamluk period. It is one of the few well-preserved hammams in Cairo out of the nearly 80 that existed by the end of the 19th century. It recently underwent a multi-year restoration and is now open to visitors as a historic monument.

References 

Mamluk architecture in Egypt
Muizz Street
Public baths in the Arab world
Medieval Cairo
Buildings and structures in Cairo